Mount Woolsey is located in the Bighorn Mountains in the U.S. state of Wyoming. The peak is the third highest in the range after Cloud Peak, which is only  to the south, and the summit is located in the Cloud Peak Wilderness of Bighorn National Forest. Black Tooth Mountain, the second highest mountain in the Bighorns, is an adjacent summit only  to the northwest. Mount Woolsey is on a knife-like ridge known as an arête and is connected to both Black Tooth Mountain and Cloud Peak by this ridge. Along the arête is another mountain peak known as The Innominate. A small glacier lies below the arête to the southeast of Mount Woolsey.

References

Woolsey
Woolsey
Woolsey
Bighorn National Forest